Josef Wilhelm Viktor Vigier (27 August 1823, in Solothurn – 18 March 1886) was a Swiss politician and President of the Swiss Council of States (1862/1863 and 1882/1883).

Vigier was also a judge of the Federal Supreme Court of Switzerland (1858–1874). He presided the court in 1864 and 1873.

He was an uncle of the national councilor and mayor of Solothurn Wilhelm Vigier (1839–1908).

External links 

 
 
 

1823 births
1886 deaths
People from Solothurn
Swiss Old Catholics
Members of the Council of States (Switzerland)
Presidents of the Council of States (Switzerland)
Federal Supreme Court of Switzerland judges
19th-century Swiss judges
19th-century Swiss politicians